Kotzias is a Greek surname. It is the surname of:
 Konstantinos Kotzias (1892–1951), Greek olympic fencer and Mayor of Athens.
 Kostis Kotzias (1921–1979), Greek writer and dramaturge.
 Nikos Kotzias (born 1950), Greek political theorist and Foreign Minister of Greece between 2015 and 2018.

See also
 Kotzia Square

Greek-language surnames
Surnames